Aloeides pierus, the dull copper, is a butterfly of the family Lycaenidae. It is found in South Africa, where it is found in the Western, Northern and Eastern Cape, as well as the Free State.

The wingspan is 25–30 mm. Adults are on wing from September to April, with peaks in October and February. There are multiple generations per year.

The larvae feed on Aspalathus species. They shelter in the nests of Lepisiota capensis ants during the day.

References

Butterflies described in 1779
Aloeides
Endemic butterflies of South Africa